The Case of the Constant Suicides, first published in 1941, is a detective story by John Dickson Carr. Like much of Dickson Carr's work, this novel is a locked room mystery, in addition to being a whodunnit.  Unlike most of the other Dr. Fell novels, this story has a high humour level, reminiscent of the Henry Merrivale works.

Plot summary

Members of a large and widespread Scottish family are brought  together at a highland castle in order to resolve various pieces of family business following a death. Suspicious events soon begin to occur, the body count rises, and a verdict of suicide is not necessarily to be trusted. Enter the gargantuan Doctor Gideon Fell, who applies his substantial powers of deduction to the problem of how men can be indirectly murdered while they're inside locked, sealed and inaccessible rooms.

Characters in "The Case of the Constant Suicides"
Gideon Fell – medical doctor and amateur detective, protagonist
Dr. Alan Campbell (M.A. Oxon, Ph.D. Harvard) – professor of history
Dr. Kathryn Campbell – teaches history at the Harpenden College for Women
Dr. Colin Campbell
Miss Elspat Campbell
Charles E. Swan
Alec Forbes
Alistair Duncan
Walter Chapman
Jock Fleming

Literary significance and criticism
"This has been called 'Carr at his best' by someone in the Saturday Review.  The statement is true, for this tale offers a few characters and a few problems that are soberly and adroitly dealt with, instead of being enveloped in a mixture of highjinks and red herrings as the author likes to do with his good situations and brilliant solutions."

References

1941 American novels
Novels by John Dickson Carr
Locked-room mysteries
Novels set in Highland (council area)
Hamish Hamilton books
Harper & Brothers books